The Reformed Churches (Restored), also known as the New Reformed Churches constitute a Christian denomination in the Netherlands. It separated from the Reformed Churches in the Netherlands (Liberated) in 2003. Officially named the "Reformed Churches in the Netherlands", they are usually called the "Reformed Churches (Restored)" to avoid confusion with the Reformed Churches in the Netherlands (Liberated) and the Reformed Churches in the Netherlands (GKN).

In 2003 in the GKV a group become dissatisfied, and separated from the GKV, because of the Synod decision on divorce and Sunday rest.

The Three Forms of Unity, the Belgic Confession, Canons of Dort and the Heidelberg Catechism are the official standards adopted in the First Synod meetind in 2005.

In 2022 the church had one Synod, 2 classes and 10 congregations in the Netherlands.In the Southwest Classis are congregations in Bleiswijk, Amersfoort, Dalfsen and Zwolle. In the Northeast Classis are congregations in Emmen, Groningen, Opeinde, Marienberg, Lutten and Assen.

A family magazine is being published by members of the churches (De Bazuin). The denomination publishes its own English magazine the Reformed Continua.

References

External links
  Official site

Christian organizations established in 2003
Reformed denominations in the Netherlands
2003 establishments in the Netherlands
Calvinist denominations established in the 21st century